James W. Hubbard (born March 20, 1948) is an American politician who represents district 23A in the Maryland House of Delegates.

Background
Delegate Hubbard was born in Washington, D.C., on March 20, 1948; he graduated from the University of Maryland with a B.A. in 1986.

In the legislature
He voted in favor of increasing the sales tax by 20% - Tax Reform Act of 2007(HB2)
He voted in favor of in-state tuition for illegal immigrants in 2007 (HB6)

References

Democratic Party members of the Maryland House of Delegates
People from Washington, D.C.
1948 births
Living people
21st-century American politicians